The Tataviam (Kitanemuk: people on the south slope) are a Native American group in Southern California. The ancestral land of the Tataviam people includes northwest present-day Los Angeles County and southern Ventura County, primarily in the upper basin of the Santa Clara River, the Santa Susana Mountains, and the Sierra Pelona Mountains. They are distinct from the Kitanemuk and the Gabrielino-Tongva peoples.

Their tribal government is based in San Fernando, California, and includes the Executive Branch, the Legislative Branch, the Tribal Senate, and the Council of Elders. The current Tribal President of the Fernandeño Tataviam Band of Mission Indians is Rudy Ortega Jr., who is a descendant of the village of Tochonanga. 

The Tataviam are a not federally recognized, which has prevented the tribe from being seen as sovereign and erased the identity of tribal members. The tribe has established an Acknowledge Rent campaign to acknowledge "the financial hardships placed on non-federally recognized tribes."

History

Ancestral land
The Santa Clarita Valley is believed to be the center of Tataviam territory, north of the Los Angeles metropolitan area. In 1776, they were noted as a distinct linguistic and cultural group, by Padre Francisco Garcés, and have been distinguished from the Kitanemuk and the Fernandeño.

Lifestyle
The Tataviam people had summer and winter settlements. They harvested Yucca whipplei and wa'at or juniper berries.<ref name=antelope>"Antelope Valley Indian Peoples: Tataviam." Antelope Valley Indian Museum. Retrieved 18 Aug 2015.</ref>

Traditional language

Colonial scholars found themselves confused in their attempts to discern the language spoken by the Tataviam.  Eventually it became clear that errors had been made in compiling their word lists: the vocabularies recorded by colonial scholar C. Hart Merriam were not in fact Tatavian, but rather were from a Chumash dialect, while the vocabularies recorded by Alfred Kroeber and John P. Harrington were of the Uto-Aztecan language, meaning it is probably more likely that their recordings are the language spoken by the Tataviam people before they experienced genocide and language loss.  Further research has shown that the Uto-Aztecan language belonged to the Takic branch of that language family, specifically the Serran branch along with Kitanemuk and Serrano. The last known Tataviam speaker died before 1916.

Neighboring tribes

According to settler accounts, the Tataviam were called the Alliklik''' by their neighbors, the Chumash (Chumash: meaning grunter or stammerer), probably because of the way their language sounds to Chumash ears.

Spanish colonization
The Spanish first encountered the Tataviam during their 1769-1770 expeditions.  According to Chester King and Thomas C. Blackburn (1978:536), "By 1810, virtually all the Tataviam had been baptized at Mission San Fernando Rey de España." Like many other indigenous groups, they suffered high rates of fatalities from infectious diseases brought by the Spanish.

Tataviam land ceded to the United States
Following the Mexican Cession 1848, the ancestral land of the Tataviam people changed from Mexican rule to being part of the United States.

The United States Indian Affairs decided to group the Tataviam with other Indian Villages in the same region, which is now Fort Tejon Indian Reservation.

The California Genocide

During the California Genocide from 1846 to 1873, California’s Native American population plunged from perhaps 150,000 to 30,000.  Many contemporary Tataviam people trace their lineage back to the original Tataviam people through genealogical records, demonstrating the resilience of the Tataviam people in the face of genocide.

Alfred L. Kroeber (1925:883) estimated the combined population of the Serrano, Kitanemuk, and Tataviam to be 3,500 people in 1770. By 1910, their population was recorded at 150.

See also
Tataviam language

Notes

Further reading
 Johnson, John R., and David D. Earle. 1990. "Tataviam Geography and Ethnohistory", Journal of California and Great Basin Anthropology 12:191-214.
 King, Chester, and Thomas C. Blackburn. 1978. "Tataviam," In California, edited by Robert F. Heizer, pp. 535–537. Handbook of North American Indians, William C. Sturtevant, general editor, vol. 8. Smithsonian Institution, Washington, D.C.
 Kroeber, A. L. 1925. Handbook of the Indians of California. Bureau of American Ethnology Bulletin No. 78. Washington, D.C.

External links
Fernandeño Tataviam Band of Mission Indians (official) 
"Tataviam", Antelope Valley Indian Museum, California Parks
Paul Higgins, "The Tataviam: Early Newhall Residents", Old Town Newhall Gazette'', January–February 1996

Native American tribes in California
California Mission Indians
History of Los Angeles County, California
History of Ventura County, California
Santa Susana Mountains
Unrecognized tribes in the United States